Aldo Boglietti from the Politecnico di Torino in Torino, Italy was named Fellow of the Institute of Electrical and Electronics Engineers (IEEE) in 2012 "for contributions to analysis of magnetic materials and AC electrical machines."

References

Fellow Members of the IEEE
Living people
Year of birth missing (living people)
Place of birth missing (living people)